Louis Rowe (born December 26, 1972) is an American basketball coach who most recently was the head coach of his alma mater, James Madison University, being introduced as the head coach on March 31, 2016. Rowe had been an assistant at James Madison, FIU, and Bowling Green. He played at James Madison from 1993 to 1995 after transferring from Florida. He ranks fifth on James Madison's career scoring average list. After college, he played professionally in Europe (Go Pass Pepinster, Antwerp Giants, Melco Ieper, Spirou Charleroi and Roanne) before turning his attention to coaching.

Rowe and James Madison University agreed to part ways on March 9, 2020. He compiled a 43–85 record in four seasons.

Head coaching record

References

External links
French League profile

1972 births
Living people
American expatriate basketball people in Belgium
American expatriate basketball people in France
American expatriate basketball people in Germany
American expatriate basketball people in Greece
American expatriate basketball people in Israel
American expatriate basketball people in Sweden
American men's basketball players
Bowling Green Falcons men's basketball coaches
College men's basketball head coaches in the United States
FIU Panthers men's basketball coaches
Florida Gators men's basketball players
Forwards (basketball)
High school basketball coaches in the United States
James Madison Dukes men's basketball coaches
James Madison Dukes men's basketball players